Eylaki-ye Pain (also Romanized as ‘Eylakī-ye Pā’īn and Eylakī Pā’īn; also known as Eylaki) is a village in Barakuh Rural District, Jolgeh-e Mazhan District, Khusf County, South Khorasan Province, Iran. At the 2006 census, its population was 412, in 114 families.

References 

Populated places in Khusf County